Uthai is a district (amphoe) in the eastern part of Ayutthaya province, in Thailand.

History
The district was originally named Uthai Yai, but was renamed Uthai in 1916.

Before the Ayutthaya kingdom was conquered by Burmese troops in 1767, Phraya Wachira Prakan (the later king Taksin) led his small group of soldiers against the Burmese troops to the east. He passed the Burmese troops and arrived at the territory in the morning. Then he named this area Uthai, which mean 'risen sun'.

Geography
Neighboring districts are (from the north clockwise) Nakhon Luang and Phachi of Ayutthaya Province; Nong Khae of Saraburi province; Wang Noi, Bang Pa-in, and Phra Nakhon Si Ayutthaya of Ayutthaya.

Administration
The district is divided into 11 sub-districts tambon, which are further subdivided into 107 villages muban. Uthai is a township (thesaban tambon) covering parts of the tambon Uthai.

References

Uthai